In the 1998–99 season, Associazione Calcio Milan returned to their previous winning ways under the guidance of new manager Alberto Zaccheroni. Hired from Udinese, Zaccheroni brought striker Oliver Bierhoff and right-wingback Thomas Helveg with him from his former club. He introduced Milan to his unorthodox 3–4–3 formation (in the latter half of the season modified to 3–4–1–2, to allow space for a creative attacking midfielder) in which Bierhoff was a perfect centre forward, scoring 20 goals in the league.

Milan had a marvelous second half of the season, in which they competed for the Serie A title with Lazio and Fiorentina. After seven straight wins in the last seven matches, Milan clinched the scudetto, becoming champions of Italy for the 16th time in their history.

Squad

Squad information

Left club during the season

Transfers

Winter

Competitions

Serie A

League table

Results by round

Matches

Coppa Italia

Round of 32

Eightfinals

Topscorers
  Oliver Bierhoff 20
  Leonardo 12
  George Weah 8
  Maurizio Ganz 4
  Guly 4

Statistics

Players statistics

References

A.C. Milan seasons
Milan
1999